Senna multiglandulosa is a species of flowering plant in the legume family known by several common names, including glandular senna, downy senna, and buttercup bush. It is native to Mexico, Guatemala, and western parts of South America, but it is widely cultivated as an ornamental plant and in some areas of the world has become naturalized in the wild. In some places it is considered a weed, for example, in New Zealand and New South Wales.

Description 
This is a hairy or woolly shrub which can grow to six meters in height, becoming treelike.

The leaves are each made up of several pairs of thick, hairy, oval-shaped leaflets each measuring up to about 4 centimeters long. The leaves are studded with visible resin glands between the leaflets.

The inflorescence is a raceme of several flowers, each with five golden yellow petals measuring 1 to 2 centimeters long. The flower has seven fertile stamens with large anthers and three sterile staminodes. The fruit is a legume pod, flattened or inflated and coated in hairs, reaching up to 12 centimeters long and filled with beanlike seeds.

References

External links
Jepson Manual Treatment
USDA Plants Profile

multiglandulosa